Rafael Alexandre Romão Victor (born 21 October 1996) is a Portuguese footballer who plays for Njarðvík as a forward.

Besides Portugal, he has played in Iceland, Israel, and Poland.

Club career
He made his league debut for Sandecja Nowy Sącz in a 2-0 away loss against GKS Tychy on 12 September 2020.

References

External links

1996 births
Living people
People from Sintra
Sportspeople from Lisbon District
Association football forwards
Portuguese footballers
S.C. Vila Real players
Louletano D.C. players
Eléctrico F.C. players
A.R.C. Oleiros players
Knattspyrnufélagið Þróttur players
F.C. Kafr Qasim players
Sandecja Nowy Sącz players
Íþróttafélagið Höttur players
1. deild karla players
Liga Leumit players
I liga players
2. deild karla players
Portuguese expatriate footballers
Expatriate footballers in Iceland
Portuguese expatriate sportspeople in Iceland
Expatriate footballers in Israel
Portuguese expatriate sportspeople in Israel
Expatriate footballers in Poland
Portuguese expatriate sportspeople in Poland